Liwiidae is a family of arthropods in the order Nektaspida. Members are known from the Cambrian and Ordovician periods.

Taxonomy 
Liwia Dzik and Lendzion, 1988
Liwia plana Lendzion, 1975
Liwia convexa Lendzion, 1975
Soomaspis Fortey & Theron, 1995
Soomaspis splendida Fortey & Theron, 1995
Tariccoia Hammann et al., 1990
Tariccoia arrusensis Hammann et al., 1990

References 

Nektaspida
Prehistoric arthropod families
Cambrian first appearances
Ordovician first appearances